Roy "Chicky" Arad (Hebrew: רועי "צ'יקי" ארד, born 1977) is an Israeli poet, singer, script-writer, artist, and political activist. Arad is the founder and former editor of Maayan magazine for poetry and a former journalist for Haaretz.

Poetry and Literature
Arad has published eight books. He formed a style that he called "Kimo" and defined as "a Hebrew adaptation of the Japanese Haiku": it consists of three lines of 10, 7, and 6 syllables. It usually describes one frozen scene that has no movement in it, and in practice, the content of the poems is close to Senryū. As an author, Arad published the book "The Israeli Dream" (Xargol-Am Oved) in 2010, "The Pelican" (Xargol-Modan) in 2013, and many short stories. In 2016, "The Israeli Dream" was chosen on Mako website as one of the ten best Israeli books of the 21st century.

Arad's poem "The Owl" which deals with the destruction of the Israeli urban city center in favor of a giant shopping mall, "The Negev Mall", interlacing elements of ancient eastern Gods, was a part of Michal Helfman's work in the Venice Biennale 2003. In 2007, a translation was published in the USA at "In Our Own Words", an anthology of young writers. He was one of the editors of three poetry anthologies: "Aduma" (the red) of socialist contemporary poetry, "Latzet" (go out) against the 2009 war in Gaza, and "The Revolution Songbook" following the social protest of summer 2011. As the publisher of Maayan, he edited several poetry books of young writers such as Vaan Nguyen's Eye of the Truffle.

Arad is co-editor (with Joshua Simon) of Maayan magazine Israeli periodical for poetry, literature, and ideas and of New&Bad Art Magazine. In July 2009, his poem, "The Night's End Anthem" was performed by the Tel Aviv philharmonic orchestra by Zubin Mehta with the music of Ella Sheriff for 100 years to Tel Aviv. Along with Mati Shemoelof, Aharon Shabtai, and Almog Behar, Arad is a key member of Guerrilla Tarbut, a group of Israeli poets and artists striving to promote social and political causes through poetry and music.

At the end of July 2009, Arad participated in the San Francisco International Poetry Festival and had a show with the influential musician Jonathan Richman. Some of Arad's poems were translated into Arabic and published in Lebanon and Egypt. 
In March 2012 he co-curated the exhibition Iran – The Exhibition, in opposition to Israeli government plans to go to war with Iran, and that seemed to have succeeded in saying something about Israeli-American security paranoia.
As a poet and author, his texts were translated into several languages and were published in several magazines, from English and Spanish Granta to French REVU and Plaine Page. Roy Chicky Arad participated in literary and poetry festivals in San Francisco, Sete (France), Rosario (argentine), Toledo (Spain), Berlin and had a residency in the International Writing Program in Iowa City.

Publications
 Hakooshi, Shadurian, 2000 (Novelettes and Kimo Poetry)
 Aerobic, Shadurian, 2003. Editor: Roee Wolman (a Novel)
 Paintings and Poetry 2000–2003, Shadurian and Tal Esther Gallery (Art and Kimo Poetry)
 Guns and Credit Cards, Plonit, 2009 (poetry)
 The Israeli Dream, Xargol-Am Oved, 2010. Editor: Eli Hirsch (Novelettes)
 Right Wage, Maayan, 2013 (a Novelette)
 The Pelican, Xargol-Modan, 2013. Editor: Eli Hirsch (a Novel)
 The Aircraft Carrier, Maayan, 2014. Editor: Aharon Shabtai (Poetry)
 The Coffee Book, Maayan Intl, 2019. Editor: Chamini Kulathunga (Poetry)

Music
In 2000 Roy's band "Ping Pong" represented Israel in the Eurovision Song Contest in Sweden with the song Sameach. At the close of voting the song had received 7 points, placing 22nd in a field of 24. The song lyrics mentioned a friend from Damascus who dates an Israeli girl. The band was dis-endorsed by the Israel Broadcasting Authority after waving the flag of Syria during the rehearsal and the video-clip of the song. They refused to back down for the performance in the final and pulled the flag out live.

In 2002 Arad released "Sonol" ("Ra Records", Israel, Produced by Ram Orion).
In 2004 Arad released "Tourists, come to Israel, it's a Nice Country".
On January 7, 2005, he released two different albums in the same day: "Monster" (Comfortstand) with French musician Chenard Walcker, and "Sputnik in Love" under the Dutch label WM Recordings.

Some of Arad's music is political. In July 2005 Arad released "I Vanunu" with Chenard Walcker (Freesamplezone, Paris), named after the atom prisoner Mordechai Vanunu. The video clip to the title song was shot in Ramallah. In 2006 Arad released his fifth solo album, "Good Friends" (Birdsong, Israel). In August 2006, Arad released a song against the war in Lebanon. In 2002, Arad was one of the organizers of "Rave against the occupation", a line of parties protesting against the Israeli policy during Second Intifada.

Journalism and scriptwriting
Arad was an editor of "Firma", a supplement in Globes between 2000 till 2009. Since 2010 Arad is a journalist in Haaretz, writing about social issues in Gonzo Journalism style. Arad participated in the blog of London Review of Books. Arad was the scriptwriter for the satirical television series Toffee and the Gorilla that aired in 2007 on the private Israeli comedy channel, Bip (channel). and directed a documentary movie about the death of construction workers in Israel.
In September 2020, 
Due to allegations of sexual misconduct with women, one of them under the age of consent, Arad has resigned from his positions in Haaretz and Maayan magazine.

See also
 Ari Libsker
 Joshua Simon

References

External links
Roy Chicky Arad website
On Haaretz
Roy Arad's articles on London Review of Books
Man of Principle, arad's novelette in international Granta.
Roy "Chicky" Arad Google Translator Blog
Kimos in the Macedonian magazine, Blesok
Poetry in Italian magazine, Private for photography and texts
About The Aircraft Carrier launching party

1977 births
Living people
Jewish Israeli writers
Jewish Israeli musicians
Israeli male poets
20th-century Israeli male musicians
21st-century Israeli male musicians
Eurovision Song Contest entrants for Israel
Eurovision Song Contest entrants of 2000
Israeli male songwriters
Musicians from Beersheba
Israeli magazine editors
Israeli anti-war activists
Writers from Beersheba